Sovetskaya Gavan  (lit. Soviet harbor) is a town in Khabarovsk Krai, Russia, and a port on the Strait of Tartary which connects the Sea of Okhotsk in the north with the Sea of Japan in the south. Population: 

It was previously known as Imperatorskaya Gavan (until 1922).

Name
The name of the town is often informally abbreviated to "Sovgavan".

History
On May 23, 1853, Lt. Nikolay Konstantinovich Boshnyak of the Russian-American Company ship Nikolay discovered the bay on which Sovetskaya Gavan is located and named it Khadzhi Bay. On August 4, 1853, Captain Gennady Nevelskoy founded a military post named after Admiral Grand Duke Konstantin, and renamed the bay to Imperatorskaya Gavan ('Emperor's Harbor' or 'Port Imperial'). The bay was also known to the English as Barracouta Harbour. Nikolay Boshnyak was appointed the commander of the post, which became the first Russian settlement in the area, and the predecessor of today's Sovetskaya Gavan.

After the abandonment of the military post before 1900, the area became a center for timber production, including concessions to companies from other countries such as Canada.

The bay and the settlement were renamed Sovetskaya Gavan in 1922.

During World War II, construction was begun on a railway from the right bank of the Amur River near Komsomolsk-on-Amur to the Pacific coast, with Sovetskaya Gavan chosen as the endpoint. Sovetskaya Gavan was granted town status in 1941; the railway reached the town in 1945. This section of railway was the first section to be completed of what would later become the Baikal-Amur Mainline.

From 1950 until 1954, the town was the site of the prison camp Ulminlag of the gulag system.

In 1958, the town's northern neighborhood, on the Vanino Bay, was separated into a separate urban-type settlement of Vanino.

In 1963–1964, six sounding rockets of "Kosmos 2"-type were launched.

Administrative and municipal status
Within the framework of administrative divisions, Sovetskaya Gavan serves as the administrative center of Sovetsko-Gavansky District even though it is not a part of it. As an administrative division, it is incorporated separately as the town of krai significance of Sovetskaya Gavan—an administrative unit with the status equal to that of the districts. As a municipal division, the town of krai significance of Sovetskaya Gavan is incorporated within Sovetsko-Gavansky Municipal District as Sovetskaya Gavan Urban Settlement.

Climate
Sovetskaya Gavan has a humid continental climate (Köppen Dfb). The mild September temperatures caused by seasonal lag keep the climate within the continental range. This also means that among summer months, June is the fourth warmest, in spite of the highest sun strength being reached during that month. Apart from that there is a strong subarctic and Siberian High influence that keeps winters extremely cold for a coastal location at 49 degrees latitude.

Economy
Sovetskaya Gavan's economy is largely dependent on the harbour and related activities; the town has a deep water port for cargo and fishing vessels, as well as ship repair facilities. There is also some foodstuffs production, such as fish processing.

Transportation
Whilst this diminished Sovetskaya Gavan's importance as a trading port, until the 1990s it remained an important supply harbor for the Russian Pacific Fleet.

Sovetskaya Gavan is connected by rail with Komsomolsk-on-Amur, the section of line being the most easterly section of the Baikal-Amur Mainline.

The town is served by Kamenny Ruchey naval airfield (also known as Mongokhto) as well as the May-gatka Airport and Mayskiy Airport airbase .

Sister city
 Everett, Washington, United States

References

Notes

Sources

External links
Official website of Sovetskaya Gavan 
The portal of the city of Sovetskaya Gavan 
Unofficial website of Sovetskaya Gavan 

Cities and towns in Khabarovsk Krai
Cities and towns built in the Soviet Union
Populated places established in 1941
Sea of Japan
1853 establishments in the Russian Empire